Jasná is a small village situated in central Slovakia, in the Low Tatras mountains. It is a part of the municipality Demänovská Dolina.

Skiing venue

The Jasná area resorts have a total of more than 30 lifts on all sides of the Chopok Mountain.  The resort Jasná Low Tatras, is said to be the largest ski area in Slovakia, with eight chair lifts and four cable cars. It has  of piste, back bowl, a  home-run, a brand new revamped terrain park, a great deal of off-piste (12 freeride zones), night skiing, and many tree runs. Jasná-Chopok is also a large resort with 41 trails covering 49 skiable kilometers of trails.

The slopes are graded as 28% beginner, 51% intermediate, and 21% advanced. Many mountain activities are available in the valley and nearby area.

Topography

Nearby areas
Nearby are entrances to the Demänovská Cave of Liberty (Demänovská jaskyňa Slobody) and Demänovská Ice Cave (Demänovská ľadová jaskyňa).

Liptovský Mikuláš is the tourist town at the base of Jasná which serves the mountain. There are many hotels and restaurants, including a UK-owned guesthouse with full equipment hire and suggestions for the region.

Liptovský Mikuláš has a direct train connection to Bratislava or by air through Poprad airport.

2022 Winter Olympic bid
If chosen, it would have been the first time that an Olympic Games would be held in multiple countries at the same time. However, in May 2014 Kraków abandoned their bid after it was rejected by the general population in a referendum.

References

External links

 jasna.sk - resort website - 
 Skiing and crosscountry at Jasná on DiscoverLiptov.com
 topskiresort.com - Jasna resort guide, rating, webcams, news...

Ski areas and resorts in Slovakia
Villages in Slovakia